Complete Greatest Hits is a greatest hits album by American rock band the Cars, released on February 19, 2002, by Elektra Records and Rhino Records. It contains 20 singles and notable album tracks in chronological order of their original release. Sales of the album reignited following Ric Ocasek's death in September 2019.

The album was released in Europe as "The Definitive". The track listing was the same although the running order was altered.

Track listing

Personnel
Credits adapted from the liner notes of Complete Greatest Hits.

The Cars
 Ric Ocasek – vocals, rhythm guitar
 Elliot Easton – lead guitar, backing vocals
 Greg Hawkes – keyboards, percussion, sax, backing vocals
 Benjamin Orr – vocals, bass guitar
 David Robinson – drums, percussion, backing vocals

Technical
 Roy Thomas Baker – production 
 Robert John "Mutt" Lange – production 
 The Cars – production ; compilation production
 Mike Shipley – production 
 Ric Ocasek – production 
 Greg Hawkes – production 
 David McLees – compilation production
 Bill Inglot – sound production
 Dan Hersch – remastering

Artwork
 Brett Milano – liner notes
 Leigh Hall – liner note coordination
 Greg Allen – art direction, design
 David Robinson – Polaroid photography
 Ebet Roberts – booklet photography
 B.C. Kagan – booklet photography
 Brian McLaughlin – photography (page 15)

Charts

Certifications

References

2002 greatest hits albums
Albums produced by Mike Shipley
Albums produced by Ric Ocasek
Albums produced by Robert John "Mutt" Lange
Albums produced by Roy Thomas Baker
The Cars compilation albums
Elektra Records compilation albums
Rhino Records compilation albums